Delilia is a genus of flowering plants in the family Asteraceae.

 Species
 Delilia biflora (L.) Kuntze - Mesoamerica, South America, Galápagos, Cuba
 Delilia inelegans (Hook.f.) Kuntze - Galápagos
 Delilia repens (Hook.f.) Kuntze - Galápagos

References

Asteraceae genera
Heliantheae